Hollyoaks is a British television soap opera that was first broadcast on 23 October 1995. The following is a list of characters introduced in 2019, by order of first appearance. All characters were introduced by executive producer, Bryan Kirkwood. The first character to be introduced is Mitchell Deveraux (Imran Adams), the son of Martine Deveraux (Kéllé Bryan). Stuart Sumner (Chris Simmons), Shahid Shirani (Alex Williams) and Amir Shirani (Naveed Choudhry) first appear in February, March and April, respectively, as part of the soap's far-right extremism story. Babs Drinkwell (Samantha Mesagno), the mother of Lily Drinkwell (Lauren McQueen), also appears in April. Sid Sumner (Billy Price), the son of Stuart, joins as a guest character in May, before being promoted to the regular cast in November. Sadie Cressington (Alexa Lee), the former girlfriend of Harry Thompson (Parry Glasspool), is also introduced in May. The following month features the introduction of Levi Rochester (Cerith Flinn), a love interest for Scott Drinkwell (Ross Adams), and the appearance of Mr Reynolds (Jack Reynolds). Azim Desai (Nav Sidhu), the half-brother of Sami Maalik (Rishi Nair), debuts in September, and during October, D.S. Naomi Cohen (Ariana Fraval), the detective sergeant investigating Harry's murder, and builder Woody Turner (Jake Quickenden) join the show. Married couple Toby Faroe (Bobby Gordon) and Celeste Faroe (Andrea Ali) are introduced in November, while Jordan Price (Connor Calland) is the final character to debut in the year, arriving in December. Additionally, multiple other characters appear throughout the year.

Mitchell Deveraux 

Mitchell Drinkwell-Deveraux (also Deveraux), portrayed by Imran Adams, first appears in episode 5100, broadcast on 8 February 2019. The character and Adams' casting details were announced on 16 December 2018. Mitchell is introduced as the son of established character Martine Deveraux (Kéllé Bryan). He is billed as "the popular new guy in town" who is levelheaded in his job as a trainee doctor. Despite having had a "strict upbringing", Mitchell is gentle and friendly. Adams has expressed his joy at joining the cast of Hollyoaks stating that he is "proud and grateful" to be a cast member. He added that it is a challenging job, which he described as "a rollercoaster of a ride" and "Acting Athletics".

Mitchell's introduction sees the character move into his cousin, Lisa Loveday's (Rachel Adedeji), flat with Martine and his grandfather, Walter Deveraux (Trevor A. Toussaint), annoying Lisa. Daniel Kilkelly of entertainment website Digital Spy reported that Mitchell would begin a relationship with a member of the McQueen family, later confirmed to be Cleo McQueen (Nadine Mulkerrin). Mitchell appears as a stripper at a themed night in The Dog in the Pond public house, organised by Cleo's grandmother, Nana McQueen (Diane Langton); this leads to him asking Cleo on a date.

Producers developed the character by introducing his long-lost siblings, Toby Faroe (Bobby Gordon) and Celeste Faroe (Andrea Ali) in November 2019. In episodes broadcast in September 2019, it emerges that Mitchell has a twin brother, and in the soap's 2019 Christmas episodes, Toby is revealed to be his twin brother. Adams thought that Mitchell would be "quite emotional and confused" if he knew Toby's identity, but thought his "compassionate" nature would make him want to build a relationship with Toby. Toby resents Martine and Mitchell for the former's decision to keep Mitchell and not Toby. Gordon said that Toby and Celeste have "ulterior motives", but did not believe that they were villains. Writers developed the twist further by revealing that Celeste is also the sister of Toby and Mitchell, making them triplets. On 21 August 2020, it was announced that Adams would leave Hollyoaks at the end of his contract. The character departs in episode 5476, broadcast on 24 November 2020. His exit story sees him blackmailed into leaving the village by Toby and Celeste.

Stuart Sumner 

Stuart Sumner, portrayed by Chris Simmons, first appears in episode 5109, broadcast on 21 February 2019. Simmons announced his casting on Twitter on 2 January 2019, but soon deleted the tweet, which expressed his excitement about joining the cast. The character and further details were announced on 20 February 2019, prior to Stuart's introduction. Stuart is connected with The Teahouse café and shares scenes with Ste Hay (Kieron Richardson). Simmons expressed his delight at his casting and believed that his character would "challenge and stretch" him.

The character is at the focus of a year-long far-right extremism story, where he grooms Ste into joining his far-right group using "psychological manipulation" to "immerse him in their anti-Islamist ideology". Hollyoaks worked with Home Office-related organisations, Prevent and ExitUK, to produce the story and raise awareness for the subject. Simmons described the story as "dark" and said that Stuart is using "a disguise of respectability" and demonstrating how he is "friendly and good with Ste's children". The actor called Stuart "very clever and charismatic" and explained that he "genuinely believes what he believes". The character was killed off in an extended episode of the soap, episode 5301, broadcast on 18 November 2019, marking Simmons' final appearance.

Keen to portray himself as the respectable owner of the Teahouse, Stuart was actually the leader of a dangerous Far Right Organisation with the intention of grooming vulnerable young men into fostering Islamophobic beliefs. Along with his right-hand man, Jonny Baxter (Ray Quinn), Stuart successfully groomed Ste over the course of a year and fuelled his hatred of Maalik family. Once Stuart had isolated Ste from the Lomaxes, he planned to detonate an explosive device in a Muslim community centre - but it accidentally detonated in the Maaliks' back garden, causing Yasmine Maalik (Haiesha Mistry) to go deaf. After that, Stuart began to realise that Ste no longer believed in the Far Right cause and became suspicious of him. Although Stuart tried to keep Ste locked in the house, his son, Sid Sumner (Billy Price) reluctantly let Ste out to see Leela Lomax (Kirsty-Leigh Porter) and Peri Lomax (Ruby O'Donnell). Realising Ste could no longer be trusted, Stuart and Jonny abducted Ste and Sami Maalik (Rishi Nair) and drove them to the clifftops - where he planned to kill them both. However, the police arrived and Sid pushed Stuart to his death to save Ste's life.

Shahid Shirani 
Shahid Shirani, portrayed by Alex Williams, first appears in episode 5124, broadcast on 14 March 2019. The character and Williams' casting details were announced on 5 March 2019. Shahid is introduced as part of a far-right extremism story when he becomes the victim of a racist attack from a gang including Stuart Sumner (Chris Simmons), Jonny Baxter (Ray Quinn) and Ste Hay (Kieron Richardson). He first appears during a special episode focusing on the story, before returning a month later. Following his return, Shahid's brother, Amir Shirani (Naveed Choudhry), is introduced as another victim to the gang. Williams expressed his excitement at joining the soap and featuring in the story alongside Richardson and Quinn. He called his first scenes "hard-hitting".

Babs Drinkwell 
Babs Drinkwell (credited as Babs), portrayed by Samantha Mesagno, appears in episode 5144, broadcast on 11 April 2019. The character was first referenced in January 2017 following the introduction of her daughter Lily Drinkwell (Lauren McQueen). Details about the character's appearance were announced on 1 April 2019. Babs is created as Lily's mother and the sister of Diane Hutchinson (Alex Fletcher). Her backstory states that she was terminally ill and died, which resulted in Lily's arrival in the village. McQueen explained that Babs' illness "forced [Lily] to grow up before her time". The character appears in flashback scenes set in 2006 as Lily, in the present day, reminisces about her childhood while dying from sepsis.

Amir Shirani 
Amir Shirani, portrayed by Naveed Choudhry, first appears in episode 5155, broadcast on 26 April 2019. The concept of the character was announced on 15 April 2019, while the character and Choudhry's casting details were announced on 18 April 2019. Amir is introduced as the brother of Shahid Shirani (Alex Williams) who appears as part of a far-right extremism story. Amir and Shahid co-own a takeaway food business and when Amir delivers food to a far-right gang, including Stuart Sumner (Chris Simmons), Jonny Baxter (Ray Quinn) and Ste Hay (Kieron Richardson), they subject him to a racist attack. Prior to this, they had also attacked Shahid. Choudhry expressed his delight at appearing in the soap and said that he felt at ease working with the cast and crew. On the extremism plot, he commented, "I've enjoyed getting my teeth into the challenging storyline – the subject matter is very relevant and I'm keen to see the response when it airs." Choudhry appears in a guest stint, and makes his final appearance in episode 5163, broadcast on 8 May 2019.

Sid Sumner 

Sid Sumner, portrayed by Billy Price, first appears in episode 5164, broadcast on 9 May 2019. The character was announced on 30 April 2019. Sid is introduced as the son of Stuart Sumner (Chris Simmons) and a new student at Hollyoaks High School. He features in the soap's far-right extremism story when he is racially abusive to fellow student Imran Maalik (Ijaz Rana) and falsely reports Imran as a terror threat. He also launches a prejudiced attack on Scott Drinkwell (Ross Adams) while he is dressed in drag. Price is initially contracted in a guest role, before being promoted to a regular character in October 2019. Sid returns as a regular during the following month and producers then plotted the character in the show's year-long county lines drug trafficking storyline.

Sadie Cressington 

Sadie Cressington, portrayed by Alexa Lee, first appears in episode 5179, broadcast on 30 May 2019. The character and Lee's casting details were announced on 21 May 2019. Sadie is introduced as the former girlfriend of Harry Thompson (Parry Glasspool). She is his alibi for the night that Grace Black (Tamara Wall) was run over in a stolen car, as the police suspect him for the crime. Glasspool explained that Sadie is a "former fling" who "wants something" from Harry. He added that Sadie is "the last thing he needs". Lee expressed her joy at joining the soap, calling the experience an "absolute pleasure and privilege". She enjoyed filming with Glasspool and Finnegan and looked forward to exploring the character further. The actress later reinforced that she was enjoying working with Glasspool and Finnegan, opining that she had "made friends for life".

When Harry explains the situation to his boyfriend, lawyer James Nightingale (Gregory Finnegan), he is surprised to discover that Harry's former partner is a woman. A show spokesperson confirmed that Harry and James would try to persuade Sadie to give Harry an alibi. Sadie pressures Harry into meeting her and paying her, which Harry tries to keep secret. Glasspool said that Harry wants Sadie "out of [his] life". Producers kept the reason for Harry paying Sadie out of advanced spoilers, and in the episode, it emerges that Sadie is pregnant with Harry's child. Glasspool explained that Sadie wants money because her family have ejected her from their home, but she is also hoping that Harry will "step up, be a dad and be in the kid's life". Sadie leaves the village when Liam Donovan (Jude Monk McGowan) pays her to leave and not be Harry's alibi.

Sadie returns to the village after receiving a call informing her that Harry is dying, but when she arrives, she discovers Harry is well. Lee told Alice Penwill of Inside Soap that Sadie is "torn whether to stay or go". Sadie admits to James that she was paid off, which helps his case for proving Harry innocent. When asked by Penwill, Lee said that she thought Sadie would make a good friend for Mercedes McQueen (Jennifer Metcalfe) or Peri Lomax (Ruby O'Donnell) due to their similar personalities and experiences. On another visit to the village, Sadie goes into labour with Harry's son. Harry's father Tony Hutchinson (Nick Pickard) and Breda McQueen (Moya Brady) to help, and gives birth to a boy, Isaac. Glasspool pointed out that the experience "happens so fast" and makes Harry reconsider his stance on Sadie and the baby, deciding to be involved in their lives. He added that Harry believes that there is  "no point holding a grudge against Sadie". The character makes her final appearance in episode 5218, broadcast on 24 July 2019.

Levi Rochester 

Levi Rochester, portrayed by Cerith Flinn, first appears in episode 5190, broadcast on 14 June 2019. The character and Flinn's casting details were announced on 7 June 2019. Levi is introduced as a specialist doctor in Maxine Minniver's (Nikki Sanderson) Munchausen's syndrome storyline. The character is billed as "a no-nonsense doctor" with a high patient success rate. Flinn expressed his enjoyment at filming on the soap. Levi arrives to help to diagnose Maxine after seeing her appear on daytime television show This Morning to discuss her undiagnosed condition. Flinn explained that he arrives to "solve a mystery", but soon realises that Maxine is faking her condition. The actor told Inside Soap Sarah Ellis that Levi would "leave no stone unturned" in his journey to diagnose Maxine. He is prepared to question Maxine and run numerous tests on her. The actor noted, "Maxine thinks that she can outwit Levi, but he's at the top of his game." A show spokesperson teased that as Maxine tries to "pull the wool over everyone's eyes", she may struggle with Levi.

Levi is also introduced as a love interest for Scott Drinkwell (Ross Adams), who has struggled finding love. Their romance is billed as a "heartwarming romantic connection" which would be tested. Flinn liked starring opposite Adams, who he called "an absolute pleasure" and "a pure gentleman". The characters first meet while Scott is performing as a drag artist in The Dog in the Pond public house, which Levi's friend Mitchell Deveraux (Imran Adams) takes him to see. Levi dislikes drag acts and views them as "an offence to gay people", but he does not recognise Scott as he is not wearing his glasses at the show. The following day, Levi notices Scott, who is not wearing drag, since he is wearing his glasses and is attracted to him. Flinn thought that the characters were "a good match" for each other as they were very different people professionally. He added that this brings the pair "closer together". Adams also liked the pairing and received a positive response about the relationship from the audience. He told Ellis (Inside Soap) that the relationship would be short-term, and the story ends when Levi sees Scott in drag and ends their relationship, unable to "get past the drag aspect". This marks the character's departure from the series, making his final appearance in episode 5223, broadcast on 31 July 2019.

Mr Reynolds 
Mr Reynolds, portrayed by Jack Reynolds, appears in episode 5191, broadcast on 17 June 2019. The character is a guest role and appears in a single scene. Reynolds' appearance was announced on 8 April 2019 and he filmed his appearance on the same day. In his appearance, Reynolds' character approaches Maxine Minniver (Nikki Sanderson) and offers her "some words of comfort and sage wisdom". Like Reynolds, the character is 107-years-old. His appearance on Hollyoaks also marked Reynolds' first acting role in 100 years. He expressed his pride at starring on the soap and called the experience "wonderful". On-set, Reynolds received support from Sanderson, Adam Rickitt (Kyle Kelly) and Jacob Roberts (Damon Kinsella). The appearance marks a world record for being the "oldest person to perform as a supporting artist on a TV show". The record is Reynolds' fourth world record in as many years.

Azim Desai 

Azim Desai, portrayed by Nav Sidhu, first appears in episode 5255, broadcast on 13 September 2019. The character was first referenced in August 2019, but the character's introduction and Sidhu's casting details were announced on 5 September 2019. Azim is introduced as the half-brother of Sami Maalik (Rishi Nair), although Johnathon Hughes of the Radio Times reported that Azim is embedded within the entire Maalik family. The character is billed as "flamboyant", "lively" and "fun-loving", while Sidhu described the character as fun, friendly, intelligent and "a fixer". Azim is an event planner who decides to host an engagement party for Sami and his fiancée, Sinead Shelby (Stephanie Davis), after they announce their engagement. The character's backstory states that he has been living in Australia working for "the rich and famous". Azim is single and Sidhu teased that he could be given a love interest. Sidhu liked Azim's job and enjoyed working with the Maalik family, feeling pleased to be introduced as part of "an established family". For his audition, Sidhu performed a screen test with Nair, which made him feel at ease as he knew Nair from when he appeared in Sidhu's 2016 short film. Nair was surprised to learn that Sami has a brother, but liked the decision and thought Amir's creation had "changed the family dynamic". He also liked that Sami had another character that is of a similar age. The actor added that he enjoyed working with Sidhu, who he deemed a good casting as they look alike.

The character's introduction occurs during a week of episodes focusing on the show's far-right extremism story, which involves the Maalik family's conflict with a far-right activist gang. Bryan Kirkwood, the show's executive producer, said that the episodes would have an effect on the family "forever". Writers incorporated Azim into the story when Ste Hay (Kieron Richardson), who has been groomed into joining the group, reaches out to him for help. Sidhu explained that Azim recognises Ste's "cry for help" because he witnessed a friend experience a similar situation to Ste, but was unable to help him. He added that Ste is "a young man offering an olive branch needing a way out", something which Azim resonates with. Azim is conflicted on whether to help Ste as he is aware of what the organisation has done to the Maalik family. Sidhu said that the opportunity to have "one less extremist in the mix" persuades Azim to help Ste. When Azim meets Ste face-to-face for the first time, he feels more confident that Ste is being honest. They share a kiss and Sidhu said the pair would make "an interesting cocktail". Show scriptwriter Jonathan Larkin named the pairing as a potential new couple, although the romance was cut short by Richardson leaving the soap.

Writers then plotted Azim in Mitchell Deveraux's (Imran Adams) coming out story and his relationship with Scott Drinkwell (Ross Adams). When Mitchell feels unable to come out as gay, Scott struggles to be in a relationship with him and grows close with Azim. Imran Adams explained that Scott sees characteristics in Azim that he wants from Mitchell: "to be proud and openly gay, and someone who doesn't have to hide." While on a date, Scott and Mitchell are spotted by Azim, causing Mitchell to hide their relationship again. Azim and Scott are then paired romantically and begin dating. Ross Adams told Sarah Ellis, writing for Inside Soap, that unlike Mitchell, Azim accepts Scott and is "proud to be seen with him", something which is important to Scott. He added that Azim and Scott share similar qualities and are "comfortable with themselves", something which the actor thought made them a good pairing.

Azim is offered a new job in London and asks Scott to leave with him, which he agrees to do. Believing his romance with Mitchell to be over, Scott decides that he should "make a go of things" with Azim. Azim has an argument with Mitchell and afterwards, Scott is supportive of Azim but defends Mitchell. Ross Adams pointed out that this "upsets Azim a little bit". After Mitchell openly admits his love for Scott, he ends his relationship with Azim. On the decision, Ross Adams said that although Azim pleases Scott, he does not "ignite that fire that Mitchell does". The actor opined that Azim would be a sensible choice for a relationship as he has "less baggage" than Mitchell. A poll ran by Inside Soap revealed that 55% of readers wanted Scott to pursue a relationship with Azim. The character departs from the series in episode 5359, broadcast on 6 February 2020, and it was confirmed on 11 February that Sidhu had completed filming with the show and would not return.

D.S. Naomi Cohen 

D.S. Naomi Cohen, portrayed by Ariana Fraval, first appears in episode 5269, broadcast on 3 October 2019. Fraval's casting was announced by her agent on 23 August 2019, while details about the character were announced on 3 October 2019. D.S. Cohen is introduced as a detective sergeant who is investigating the murder of Harry Thompson (Parry Glasspool). Johnathon Hughes of the Radio Times confirmed that the character would appear on a recurring guest basis, and writers plotted her into the show's "Who Shot Mercedes?" plot, which sees Mercedes McQueen (Jennifer Metcalfe) shot in The Loft nightclub. Fraval stars opposite her husband, actor Gregory Finnegan, who portrays Harry's boyfriend, James Nightingale, and her first scenes on the soap were with him. Finnegan enjoyed working with Fraval, but noted that her casting complicated their childcare arrangements. He later praised her work on the show in a press interview, commenting, "she has really hit the ground running now and knows everyone so feels a lot more comfortable".

D.S. Cohen arrives to take James Nightingale to identify the body of Harry Thompson. When James positively identifies Harry's body, she informs Harry's stepmother, Diane Hutchinson (Alex Fletcher), about his death. She later investigates an assault on Joel Dexter (Rory Douglas-Speed), who was attacked by Liam Donovan (Jude Monk McGowan). When Cindy Cunningham (Stephanie Waring) reports having witnessed Liam follow Joel into an alleyway, D.S. Cohen arrests Liam. However, after Joel is threatened, he informs D.S. Cohen that a random person attacked him and it was not Liam. She later informs Diane about the release of Harry's body. When Diane reports Mercedes for Harry's murder, D.S. Cohen arrives to arrest her, but cannot find her; Mercedes' husband, Sylver McQueen (David Tag), refuses to reveal Mercedes' location. James argues with D.S. Cohen about not arresting Mercedes.

D.S. Cohen questions Liam about the disappearance of Mercedes, but they are stopped when Mercedes' cousin, Goldie McQueen (Chelsee Healey), discovers her unconscious body in The Loft nightclub, having been shot. She then questions Liam about the lack of CCTV footage in The Loft during the shooting. During the following day, she collects alibis from Sylver, Liam and Grace Black (Tamara Wall). After receiving a tip-off from Liam, she searches The Dog in the Pond public house for a gun, which Grace is able to hide. Sylver warns D.S. Cohen that Liam could have shot Mercedes, so when the police find the gun in Liam's car, she arrests him. She prepares to charge Liam for the shooting until James, his lawyer, intervenes and has the charges dropped. D.S. Cohen interviews Sid Sumner (Billy Price) for the murder of his father, Stuart Sumner (Chris Simmons), after he pushes him from a cliff; she drops the charges when witness statements state Sid acted in self-defence. When Mercedes awakens from her coma and tells D.S. Cohen that Sylver shot her, she arrests him, and charges him for attempted murder. When blood is discovered at the shooting crime scene, Diane confesses to D.S. Cohen that it belongs to her. Diane also presents her with CCTV footage of her kissing Edward Hutchinson (Joe McGann) as her alibi, which also confirms the time of the shooting. Later, Mercedes informs D.S. Cohen that she is retracting her statement about Sylver shooting her.

After Breda McQueen (Moya Brady), who is a serial killer, anonymously hands in a written confession, D.S. Cohen runs forensics on the confession and assesses that Mercedes is the serial killer, so arrests her and clashes with Goldie. She then orders a search of Mercedes' home, but fails to find any evidence that could convict her. After a hostage situation at Breda's pig farm, where Breda is exposed as the serial killer (see Hollyoaks Later (2020 special)), D.S. Cohen tries to ask Mercedes for her version of events, but she is rebuffed. Following the death of Jesse Donovan (Luke Jerdy), D.S. Cohen returns his personal items to his wife, Courtney Campbell (Amy Conachan), and explains to his siblings, Grace and Liam, that Jesse died from alcohol poisoning. After reviewing the footage of Jesse drinking, she decides not to launch an investigation into his death. D.S. Cohen later arrests Mitchell Deveraux (Imran Adams) for homophobic abuse against Azim Desai (Nav Sidhu), but releases him when Azim drops the charges. Tony Hutchinson (Nick Pickard), who was Breda's prisoner for months and is suffering with post-traumatic stress disorder as a result, asks D.S. Cohen about Breda's body; she reveals that it was mostly burnt, fueling his paranoia that Breda has returned. After learning the whereabouts of Warren Fox (Jamie Lomas), who is wanted by the police, D.S. Cohen arrests him, but soon releases him when Brody Hudson (Adam Woodward) confirms Warren's version of events. She later arrests Warren after witnessing him assault Liam. Acting as Warren's lawyer, James confronts D.S. Cohen about the arrest and has him released. When Felix Westwood (Richard Blackwood) is attacked, D.S. Cohen questions his children, Mitchell, Toby Faroe (Bobby Gordon) and Celeste Faroe (Andrea Ali). Celeste lies that Mitchell was responsible for the attack, so D.S. Cohen arrests him. She then questions Mitchell and later, his boyfriend, Scott Drinkwell (Ross Adams).

Edward Hutchinson 

Edward Hutchinson, portrayed by Joe McGann, first appears in episode 5281, broadcast on 21 October 2019. The character was referenced during the early years of the show as Brian Hutchinson, while details about the character's introduction and McGann's casting were announced on 20 May 2019. Edward is introduced as the estranged father of established character Tony Hutchinson (Nick Pickard). The character is billed as "a highly manipulative and narcissistic surgeon", which contrasts Tony's characterisation. McGann joked that his mother would be "really proud" of his surgeon status. The actor, who was invited to the role, expressed his excitement at joining the soap. Bryan Kirkwood, the show's executive producer, explained that Edward is introduced to explore his relationship with Tony, in the build-up to the show's anniversary. He expressed his delight at hiring an actor of McGann's "calibre", and commented, "we can't wait to see the phenomenal Joe McGann bring this huge character to life." Pickard also expressed his delight at McGann's casting and liked that producers had decided to expand Tony's family. He also warned that Edward would "ruffle a few feathers". Rishma Dosani of the Metro was excited about Edward's introduction.

The character's backstory and his absence in Tony's life is explored following his introduction. His backstory states that after Edward left Tony, he had a breakdown and "reinvented himself", now calling himself by his middle name. In his absence, Edward returned to the medical profession and Kirkwood pointed out that he became "a very high-status, very strident leading man". Producers devised Edward as the soap's new supervillain character, a trait which has previously been occupied by Doctor Browning (Joseph Thompson) and Lindsey Butterfield (Sophie Austin). Kirkwood deemed the character "a force to be reckoned with", and explained that Edward would be a "different kind of villain" than Browning and Lindsey and called him "a very interesting villain and very complex". A show spokesperson later confirmed that Edward would become "one of the biggest villains the show has seen". In September 2019, it was confirmed that Edward's daughter would be introduced to the soap. She is billed as similarly villainous than Edward and a show spokesperson said that family would create an "exciting, fresh dynamic for Tony". Eva O'Hara was later cast as Edward's daughter, Verity Hutchinson. Pickard expressed his excitement to work with his new on-screen family.

In December 2020, it was announced that McGann had filmed his final scenes as Edward, and that his "explosive" exit would be aired later that month. It was stated that "he goes out with a bang", and explained his exit by saying "a character like that can only have a certain shelf life and fans are now ready for his comeuppance."

Woody Turner 
Woody Turner, portrayed by Jake Quickenden, first appears in episode 5284, broadcast on 24 October 2019. The concept of the character and Quickenden's casting details were announced on 27 July 2019, while further details about the character were announced on 9 August 2019. Quickenden previously expressed his interest in a role on the soap in March 2018. Woody is introduced as a "hunky" builder who is involved in the show's annual stunt. He is described as "a liability" and "a cheeky chap". The character appears in a guest stint and Quickenden began filming on 7 August 2019. Quickenden was invited by producers to star in the soap and appears opposite Cindy Cunningham actress Stephanie Waring, who he starred with in reality TV competition Dancing on Ice. The actor felt at ease on-set because he was working with Waring. He also expressed an interest in reprising the role as a regular cast member. The character makes his final appearance in episode 5289, broadcast on 31 October 2019.

Toby Faroe 

Toby Faroe, portrayed by Bobby Gordon, first appears in episode 5309, broadcast on 28 November 2019. The character and Gordon's casting details were announced on 22 November 2019. Toby is introduced alongside his "wife", Celeste Faroe (Andrea Ali), as they move in next to Darren Osborne (Ashley Taylor Dawson) and Mandy Morgan (Sarah Jayne Dunn), who they befriend. Toby is a music producer and he and Celeste are billed as mysterious, "manipulative" and "devious". Toby soon tries helping hair salon owner Jesse Donovan (Luke Jerdy) by offering to arrange for one of his artists to promote his salon, but Toby does not do this. Gordon secured the role in August 2019, and he expressed his delight at joining the show's cast after struggling to find employment for a year. Johnathon Hughes of the Radio Times dubbed Toby and Celeste as mysterious, commenting, "Buckets of intrigue surrounded the recent arrival of Toby Faroe (Bobby Gordon) and his wife Celeste Faroe (Andrea Ali)".

Producers created Toby as the twin brother of Mitchell Deveraux (Imran Adams) and son of Martine Deveraux (Kéllé Bryan), but his identity was not revealed until the soap's 2019 Christmas episodes. The twist was first teased prior to Toby's introduction, in September 2019, when it emerged that Mitchell has a twin brother. Having already kept his casting a secret, Gordon found it easier to keep the secret about Toby's parentage. Toby resents Martine and Mitchell for the former's decision to keep Mitchell and not Toby. Gordon said that Toby and Celeste have "ulterior motives", but did not believe that they were villains. He added that Toby has needed Celeste to "function" as she "protects him and allows him to be himself". Writers developed the twist further by revealing that Celeste is also the sister of Toby and Mitchell, making them triplets. Ali explained that Toby and Celeste have a close relationship and that Celeste relies on Toby. As part of the story, "disturbing" flashbacks depict Toby and Celeste's upbringing, where they were brought up in a social experiment. In the flashbacks, T'Jai Adu-Yeboah portrayed Toby as a teenager, while Caelan Edie portrayed a younger Toby.

In February 2022, in previously unannounced scenes, Gordon made his final appearance as Toby. His final scenes see him arrested for the murder of his cousin Lisa Loveday (Rachel Adedeji) after being reported by his father, Felix Westwood (Richard Blackwood).

Celeste Faroe 

Celeste Faroe, portrayed by Andrea Ali, first appears in episode 5309, broadcast on 28 November 2019. The character and Ali's casting details were announced on 22 November 2019. Celeste is introduced alongside her "husband", Toby Faroe (Bobby Gordon), as they move in next to Darren Osborne (Ashley Taylor Dawson) and Mandy Morgan (Sarah Jayne Dunn), who they befriend. Celeste is a modelling agent and she and Toby are billed as mysterious, "manipulative" and "devious". Additionally, Celeste is described as glamorous, which attracts Mandy to her. Ali expressed her delight at joining the show's cast, calling it "one [of] the most amazing experiences". Johnathon Hughes of the Radio Times dubbed Toby and Celeste as mysterious, commenting, "Buckets of intrigue surrounded the recent arrival of Toby Faroe (Bobby Gordon) and his wife Celeste Faroe (Andrea Ali)".

Producers created Celeste as the sister to Toby and Mitchell Deveraux (Imran Adams), making them triplets, and the daughter of Martine Deveraux (Kéllé Bryan), but her identity was not revealed until March 2020. Ali struggled to keep the secret, especially since she found viewers would "pick up on things very quickly". The story began in September 2019 when it emerged that Mitchell has a twin brother, and continued in the soap's 2019 Christmas episode when Toby is revealed to be the twin brother. Gordon said that Celeste and Toby have "ulterior motives", but did not believe that they were villains. He added that Toby has needed Celeste to "function" as she "protects him and allows him to be himself". Ali explained that Toby and Celeste have a close relationship and that Celeste relies on Toby. As part of the story, "disturbing" flashbacks depict Celeste and Toby's upbringing, where they were brought up in a social experiment. In the flashbacks, Murnaya Martin portrayed Celeste as a teenager, while Leah Mondesir-Simmonds portrayed a younger Celeste. Celeste was killed-off as part of the "Time Out" week on 12 January 2022.

Jordan Price 

Jordan Price, portrayed by Connor Calland, first appears in episode 5329, broadcast on 30 December 2019. The character and Calland's casting details were announced on 10 December 2019. Jordan is introduced as the cousin of established character Sid Sumner (Billy Price). He is billed as a "confident, chaotic and unpredictable" drug dealer whose backstory states that he has been involved with crime for the previous few years. Calland stated that Jordan's "dark direction" occurred following a difficult upbringing and the death of his mother, which lead him to search for a "father figure" in the "drug world". Writers plotted the character into the show's year-long county lines drug trafficking storyline and Jordan is introduced during a special flashforward episode exploring the effects of the drug trafficking after a year. Calland expressed his excitement at joining the cast and working on "a hard hitting and relevant" storyline, which he hoped would create awareness for the issue.

Jordan is given a love interest in Leela Lomax (Kirsty-Leigh Porter) after he becomes involved with her family following her decision to foster Sid. Calland explained that Jordan finds Leela attractive and she is "drawn in with his flirtatious ways". Jordan interacts with Leela's daughter, Peri Lomax (Ruby O'Donnell), and finds that it takes a while to understand how to "play her". Calland noted that they are "very different" people, so Jordan has to alter his "tactics" when dealing with her. In December 2019, "flashforward" scenes showed a bodybag, with the victim unknown to viewers until a year later; after a year of speculation, it was revealed that Jordan had been killed-off when Ella Richardson (Erin Palmer) stabs him in the back.

Other characters

References

, Hollyoaks
2019
Hollyoaks